WLOL may refer to:

 WLOL (AM), a radio station (1330 AM) licensed to Minneapolis, Minnesota, United States
 WLOL-FM, a radio station (89.7 FM) licensed to Morgantown, West Virginia, United States
 KSJN, a radio station (99.5 FM) licensed to Minneapolis, Minnesota, United States, which held the call sign WLOL-FM from 1957 to 1991
 World List of Lights, database of lighthouses